Events in the year 2021 in Tonga.

Incumbents
 Monarch: Tupou VI
 Prime Minister: Pōhiva Tuʻiʻonetoa

Events
Ongoing — COVID-19 pandemic in Tonga
30 November – 2021 Tongan general election

Deaths

 29 July – Baroness Tuputupu Vaea, 92, royal
 29 August – Sione Vuna Fa'otusia, 68, Tongan politician, deputy (since 2014), minister for justice and prisons (2014–2019), and deputy prime minister (2019–2020).
 15 October – Tuineau Alipate, 54, Tongan-born American football player (Minnesota Vikings, Saskatchewan Roughriders, New York Jets).
 12 December – Maʻafu Tukuiʻaulahi, 66, noble and politician, MP (since 2008).
 16 December – Taniela Moa, 36, rugby union player (Auckland, Section Paloise, national team).

References

 
2020s in Tonga
Years of the 21st century in Tonga
Tonga
Tonga